Epacris calvertiana is a plant of the heath family, Ericaceae and is endemic to New South Wales. It is an erect to diffuse shrub with elliptic to egg-shaped leaves with a sharp-pointed tip and with white, pink or red flowers arranged along the ends of leafy branchlets.

Description
The five stamens and the single style are enclosed in the petal tube.

Taxonomy and naming
Epacris calvertiana was first formally described in 1873 by Ferdinand von Mueller and the description was published in the journal, Fragmenta phytographiae Australiae. The specific epithet (calvertiana) honours Louisa Atkinson, (under her married name of Louisa Calvert) who collected the type specimen.

Two varieties are accepted by the Australian Plant Census:
 Epacris calvertiana var. calvertiana has flowers usually  in diameter and white, cream-coloured or creamy green flowers;
 Epacris calvertiana var. versicolor has flowers usually  in diameter and pink to red flowers with white or cream-coloured lobes.

Distribution and habitat
Drumstick heath mainly occurs along the coast and tablelands of New South Wales from Pigeon House Mountain to the Comboyne Plateau and inland as far as Berrima.

References 

calvertiana
Ericales of Australia
Flora of New South Wales
Plants described in 1873
Endemic flora of Australia
Taxa named by Ferdinand von Mueller